Hatay Büyükşehir Belediye Gençlik ve Spor Kulübü , known as Hatay Büyükşehir Belediyespor, is a Turkish sports club, based in Hatay, Turkey.

Hatay Büyükşehir Belediyespor is a multi-sports club and competes in Football, Basketball, Volleyball, Chess, Water polo, Swimming, Archery, Athletics, Tennis, Wrestling, Muay Thai, Karate and Kickboxing.

Previous names 
Antakya Belediyesi (2010–2014)
Hatay Büyükşehir Belediyespor (2014–present)

Departments

Football

Women's Football 

Hatay Büyükşehir Belediyesi women's football team competes in the third-level of Turkish Women's Football League.

Deaf Football 

Hatay Büyükşehir Belediyesi deaf football team competes in the first-level of Turkish Deaf Football League.
Achievements
 Turkish Deaf Football First League
  Third (1): 2013–2014

Basketball

Women's Basketball 

Hatay Büyükşehir Belediyesi women's basketball team competes in the first-level of Turkish Women's Basketball League.
Achievements
 Turkish Women's Basketball League
 Runners-up (1): 2015–16
 Turkish President Cup:
 Champions (1): 2016

Volleyball

Men's Volleyball 

Hatay Büyükşehir Belediyesi men's volleyball team competes in the second-level of Turkish Men's Volleyball League.

Chess 
Hatay Büyükşehir Belediyesi chess team competes in the first-level of Türkiye İş Bankası Chess League.
Achievements
 Türkiye İş Bankası Chess League:
 Champions (1): 2016
 Runners-up (1): 2014
Third place (1): 2017

References 

Sport in Antakya
Multi-sport clubs in Turkey